Kʼinich Muwaan Jol, (died 359) was ajaw of the Maya city-state of Tikal. He was father of Chak Tok Ichʼaak I and he ruled until 359.

Notes

Footnotes

References

Rulers of Tikal
4th century in the Maya civilization
4th-century monarchs in North America
359 deaths